USA-132, also known as GPS IIR-2 and GPS SVN-43, is an American navigation satellite which forms part of the Global Positioning System. It was the second Block IIR GPS satellite to be launched, out of thirteen in the original configuration, and twenty one overall. GPS IIR-1 failed to achieve orbit, so USA-132 was the first successful Block IIR satellite. It was built by Lockheed Martin, using the AS-4000 satellite bus.

Launch 
USA-132 was launched at 03:43:01 UTC on 23 July 1997, atop a Delta II launch vehicle, flight number D245, flying in the 7925-9.5 configuration. The launch took place from Launch Complex 17A (LC-17A) at the Cape Canaveral Air Force Station (CCAFS), and placed USA-132 into a transfer orbit. The satellite raised itself into medium Earth orbit using a Star-37FM apogee motor.

Mission 
It is used to broadcast the PRN 13 signal, and operates in slot 3 of plane F of the GPS constellation. As of 2022 it remains in service.

References 

Spacecraft launched in 1997
GPS satellites
USA satellites